The 2019 Big Sky Conference men's basketball tournament was the postseason tournament for the Big Sky Conference, held  at CenturyLink Arena in Boise, Idaho. It was the 44th edition of the tournament, which debuted 

Regular season and defending tournament champion Montana defeated Eastern Washington 68–62 in the championship game to gain the conference's automatic bid to the 68-team NCAA tournament. It was Montana's eleventh Big Sky tournament title, which leads the conference; its first came in 1991.

Seeds
The eleven teams were seeded by conference record, with a tiebreaker to seed teams with identical conference records. The top five teams received a first round bye.

Schedule

Bracket

References

External links

Tournament
Big Sky Conference men's basketball tournament
Big Sky Conference men's basketball tournament
Big Sky Conference men's basketball tournament
Basketball competitions in Boise, Idaho
College sports tournaments in Idaho